The Graves-Sawle Baronetcy, of Penrice in the County of Cornwall and of Barley in the County of Devon, was a title in the Baronetage of the United Kingdom. It was created on 22 March 1836 for Joseph Graves-Sawle. Born Joseph Graves, he had assumed by Royal licence the surname of Sawle only in 1815, which was that of his maternal grandfather. However, in 1827 he resumed by Royal licence the surname of Graves in addition to that of Sawle. The second Baronet sat as Member of Parliament for Bodmin. The title became extinct on the death of the fourth Baronet in 1932.

Graves-Sawle baronets, of Penrice and Barley (1836)
Sir Joseph Sawle Graves-Sawle, 1st Baronet (1793–1865)
Sir Charles Graves-Sawle, 2nd Baronet (1816–1903)
Sir Francis Aylmer Graves-Sawle, 3rd Baronet (1849–1903)
Sir Charles John Graves-Sawle, 4th Baronet (1851–1932)

References

External links
 Dreadnought Project page on Fourth Baronet

Extinct baronetcies in the Baronetage of the United Kingdom